The 1925 New York Yankees season was the team's 23rd season. The team finished with a record of 69–85, in 7th place, 30 games behind the Washington Senators. New York was managed by Miller Huggins. The Yankees played at Yankee Stadium.

This season was marred by Babe Ruth's mysterious illness that kept him out a good portion of the season. It was the club's lowest finish, in both percentage and place in the standings, since their 7th-place finish in 1913. It was also the first time they had finished below .500 since 1918. The Yankees would regroup and it would be 40 years before they would finish below .500 again.

Regular season

Season standings

Record vs. opponents

Notable transactions 
 May 1925: Oscar Roettger and players to be named later were traded by the Yankees to the St. Paul Saints for Mark Koenig. The Yankees completed the deal by sending Fred Hofmann to the Saints on May 15 and Ernie Johnson to the Saints on October 28.

Roster

Player stats

Batting

Starters by position 
Note: Pos = Position; G = Games played; AB = At bats; H = Hits; Avg. = Batting average; HR = Home runs; RBI = Runs batted in

Other batters 
Note: G = Games played; AB = At bats; H = Hits; Avg. = Batting average; HR = Home runs; RBI = Runs batted in

Pitching

Starting pitchers 
Note: G = Games pitched; IP = Innings pitched; W = Wins; L = Losses; ERA = Earned run average; SO = Strikeouts

Other pitchers 
Note: G = Games pitched; IP = Innings pitched; W = Wins; L = Losses; ERA = Earned run average; SO = Strikeouts

Relief pitchers 
Note: G = Games pitched; W = Wins; L = Losses; SV = Saves; ERA = Earned run average; SO = Strikeouts

References

External links
1925 New York Yankees at Baseball Reference
1925 New York Yankees team page at www.baseball-almanac.com

New York Yankees seasons
New York Yankees
New York Yankees
1920s in the Bronx